Jason Michael Dourakos (born 7 December 1983) is a Greek fencer. He competed in the individual and team sabre events at the 2004 Summer Olympics and finished eighth in sabre, team competition.

References

External links
 

1983 births
Living people
Greek male sabre fencers
Olympic fencers of Greece
Fencers at the 2004 Summer Olympics
People from Wigan